Skrzypczak is a Polish surname. Notable people with the surname include:

 Bettina Skrzypczak (born 1963), Polish composer
 Dariusz Skrzypczak (born 1967), Polish footballer and manager
 Hubert Skrzypczak (born 1943), Polish boxer
 Mateusz Skrzypczak (born 2000), Polish footballer
 Michael Skrzypczak (1954-1988), American gay porn actor
 Waldemar Skrzypczak (born 1956), Polish general

Polish-language surnames